Phillippus Lodewicus Smit  (born 27 July 1973) is a South African former rugby union player.

Playing career
Smit matriculated at Marlow Agricultural High School in Cradock and represented  at the 1991 Craven Week tournament.

Smit toured with the Springboks to Europe in 1997 and 1998 and played in five tour matches. In 1998, he represented South Africa at sevens.

See also
List of South Africa national rugby union players – Springbok no. 660
List of South Africa national rugby sevens players

References

1973 births
Living people
South African rugby union players
South Africa international rugby union players
Griquas (rugby union) players
Sharks (Currie Cup) players
Lions (United Rugby Championship) players
Sharks (rugby union) players
South Africa international rugby sevens players
Rugby union locks
Rugby union flankers
Rugby union players from the Eastern Cape